Shreenagar is located in Wagle Estate, Thane city, Maharashtra, India It is sheltered by Sanjay Gandhi National Park.

Geography 

Shreenagar is Located at the border of Thane City and Mumbai City. 
It is nearly 5 km from Thane Railway Station and 4 km from Mulund Railway Station. It is sheltered by Sanjay Gandhi National Park.

Demographics and culture 

Shreenagar has a predominantly Maharashtrian culture. Beside Marathi, sizable populations of South Indians, Gujaratis and other people from different regions live in Shreenagar.
Ganesh Chaturthi is celebrated for 10 days in Shreenagar Ground. Navratri is also celebrated in shreenagar for 9 days where people come together and play Garba/Dandiya. Mahashivratri is celebrated on Shri Ayyappa Mandir for 1 day. Other festivals such as Holi, Diwali, Kojagiri and Christmas are celebrated in this area.

The temple of Lord Shiva which is located on a hill is quiet, scenic and utterly relaxing from inside. It is reputed to be about a hundred and fifty years old. The temple is normally opened between 5 and 1 in the morning and 4 to 10 at night, but open 24 hours during the main festival days like Mahashivratri.

List of Schools in Shreenagar 

 Shreenagar Vidya Mandir
 WEES (Wagle Estate Education Society) English High School
 Mithila English School
 Vardhmaan High School
 Billabong High International School

List of Hospitals 

 Smt. Nirmala Devi Sardarmal Jain Charitable Hospital
 Shree Hospital
 Modi Hospital
 Shivani Maternity Home

Eateries 

 AMUL Ice Cream
 Rahul Ice Cream
 Bakers House Cake Shop
 Ribbons and Ballons Cake Shop
 Prasad Sweets
 Monginis Cake Shop
 Indo China Chinese Restaurant
 Ranjeet Chinese Corner
 China Garden Chinese Corner
 Hill Breeze Restaurant And Bar
 Mavis Fastfood corner
 Solkadhi

Transport 

Transport facility includes TMT buses, Autorickshaws and Taxis. People in shreenagar prefer travelling by their own Vehicles.

Other 

 Shreenagar Police Station
 Bank of Baroda, Bank of Maharashtra, TJSB Bank, Bharat Sahakari Bank

Neighbourhoods in Thane